General Atomic and Molecular Electronic Structure System (GAMESS (US)) is computer software for computational chemistry program. The original code started on October 1, 1977 as a National Resources for Computations in Chemistry project. In 1981, the code base split into GAMESS (US) and GAMESS (UK) variants, which now differ significantly.  GAMESS (US) is maintained by the members of the Gordon Research Group at Iowa State University.  GAMESS (US) source code is available as source-available freeware, but is not open-source software, due to license restrictions.

Abilities 

GAMESS (US) can perform several general computational chemistry calculations, including Hartree–Fock method, density functional theory (DFT), generalized valence bond (GVB), and multi-configurational self-consistent field (MCSCF). Correlation corrections after these SCF calculations can be estimated by configuration interaction (CI), second order Møller–Plesset perturbation theory (MP2), and coupled cluster (CC) theory. Solvent effect can be considered using quantum mechanics and molecular mechanics through discrete effective fragment potentials or continuum models (such as PCM). Relativistic corrections can be calculated, including third order Douglas-Kroll scalar terms.

The GAMESS (US) program possesses Resolution-of-the-Identity (RI) approximated methods, which decrease the overall cost of a method by projecting the ERI tensor into three center matrices. The RI approximation has been applied to the MP2 and CCSD(T) methods, respectively. The RI-MP2 and the RI-CC code benefit from a MPI/OpenMP parallelization model allowing for great scaling and fast calculations. 

GAMESS (US) also has a series of fragmentation methods that allow the user to target larger molecular systems by partitioning a large molecule into smaller, more feasible fragments. Examples are the fragment molecular orbital (FMO) method, the Effective Fragment Potential (EFP) method, and the Effective Fragment Molecular Orbital method (EFMO).

The GAMESS (US) software also provides a comprehensive bonding analysis technique based on the Quasi-Atomic Orbital (QUAO) analysis proposed by professor Klaus Ruedenberg. The QUAO analysis provides a quasi-atomical perspective of bonding molecular orbitals in molecules. These are oriented orbitals which show the bonding direction. QUAOs are characterized by their Bond Order (BO), Kinetic Bond Order (KBO) which is a measure of the strength of the bond, and their occupation number. The QUAO analysis allows users to study bonding patterns in molecules or small to medium size with a high degree of accuracy. 

While the program does not directly perform molecular mechanics, it can do mixed quantum mechanics and molecular mechanics calculations through effective fragment potentials or through an interface with the Tinker code. The fragment molecular orbital method can be used to treat large systems, by dividing them into fragments.

It can also be interfaced with the valence bond VB2000 and XMVB programs and the Natural Bond Orbital (NBO) population analysis program.

The input files use a keyword based scheme.  For example, $CONTRL SCFTYP=ROHF MAXIT=30 $END, which specifies that the SCF part of the code should do a restricted open-shell Hartree–Fock (ROHF) calculation and quit if the result does not converge in 30 iterations.  The output is in an English language text file.

See also 
 GAMESS (UK)
 PC GAMESS, Firefly
 List of quantum chemistry and solid state physics software

References

External links 
 
 
 
 

Computational chemistry software